In Romani culture, a gadjo (masculine) or gadji (feminine) is a person who has no Romanipen. This usually corresponds to not being an ethnic Romani, but it can also be an ethnic Romani who does not live within Romani culture.  It is often used by Romanies to address or denote outsider neighbors living within or very near their community. 

Gorja, often spelled Gorger, is the Angloromani variation of the word Gadjo.

Etymology 
The exact origin of the word is not known. One theory considers that the word comes from the proto-Romani word for "peasant" and has the same root as the Romani word gav (a village).

In Spain

The word passed from Caló to Spanish slang as gachó (masculine) / gachí (feminine) acquiring the generalized meaning "man, guy" / "woman, girl". The Caló word for a non-Gitano is payo/paya.

In Portuguese
The European Portuguese words gajo (masculine) and gaja (feminine) originated in the Romani/Caló and are used in everyday language to refer informally to a man or a woman, in a usage similar to "guy" in English. The word gazim has been attested as a rare use in Brazilian Portuguese with the meaning of strange (i.e. foreign) woman, probably with roots in the Romani gadji.

In Scotland and Northern England
The word is encountered as gadgie (or sometimes gadge), a term in Scots, formerly only used by the Roma/Traveller community, but since the 20th century in general use by the Scots-speaking population. In most areas it is heard, notably Edinburgh, the Borders and Dingwall, gadgie has a generalised meaning of a man that the speaker doesn't know well. In Dundee it is a more pejorative term, referring to a poorly educated person who engages in hooliganism or petty criminality. In the village of Aberchirder it refers to a born-and-bred local.

The term is also heard in the North East of England, often referring particularly to old men.

See also
Gadjo dilo ("The crazy gadjo") is a French-Romanian film about a Frenchman who travels to Romania to find a Romani musician.
 Goy
 Gringo
 Gora (disambiguation)
 Gujjar
 Gaijin

Notes

References
 Lev Tcherenkov, Stephan Laederich "The Rroma"
 Raymond Buckland "Gypsy Witchcraft & Magic"

External links
 Excerpts from Roma by WR Rishi: ETYMOLOGY OF THE WORD "GAJO" https://web.archive.org/web/20080514005741/http://www.romani.org/rishi/retygajo.html

Ethno-cultural designations
Exonyms
Romani-related controversies
Romani society
Romani words and phrases